Mehdi Hashemi (also Romanized as Mehdī Hāshemī, born 7 December 1946) is an Iranian actor, screenwriter, and director.

He also is the winner of the ninth International Fajr Film Festival award, Crystal Simorgh, for his playing in the film Do Film Ba Yek Belit (translates "one ticket for two movies").

He is the husband of Iranian actress, Golab Adineh, and brother of Nasser Hashemi.

Selected filmography
Zende bad (Long Live) (1979)
Death of Yazdgerd (1982)
Kharej az mahdudeh (1986)
Bogzar zendegi konam (Let me Live) (1986)
Qaribe (The Alien) (1987)
Zard-e qanari (Canary Yellow) (1988)
Shekar-e khamush (The Silent Hunt) (1990)
Do film ba yek belit (Two Films with one Ticket) (1990)
Ali va ghul-e jangal (Ali and the Forest Giant) (1990)
Behtarin baba-ye donya (The Best Father in the World) (1991)
Aqa-ye bakhshdar (1991)
Once Upon a Time, Cinema (1992)
Hamsar (The Spouse) (1994)
Alo!Alo! Man jujuam (Halo! Halo! I am Joohjoo) (1994)
Moujeze-ye khandeh (The Miracle of Laughter) (1996)
Ruz-e karnameh (Report Card Day) (2003)
Hich (Nothing) (2010)
Hich 2 (2010)
Alzheimer (2011)
Tales (2014)
In Search of Peace (2016-2017)

References

External links

1946 births
Living people
Iranian male actors
Iranian screenwriters
Iranian male film actors
Iranian male stage actors
People from Gilan Province
University of Tehran alumni
Iranian male television actors
Crystal Simorgh for Best Actor winners